David Blumberg (born 12 September 1944) is a senior banker and public figure active in promoting culture and education in Israel. Since 2007 he has served as the chairman of the National Library of Israel board of directors. He previously served as chairman of the Bank of Jerusalem, CEO of United Mizrahi Bank, and CEO of Tefahot Israel Mortgage Bank.

Biography 
Born to Tova and Meir Blumberg in Haifa, Blumberg is married and a father to three children. He lives in Jerusalem. He received a BA in Economics and Political Science and an MBA from The Hebrew University of Jerusalem.

Leading the National Library of Israel Renewal 
Since 2007, Blumberg has served as the director of the National Library of Israel board of directors. In this capacity he has led the National Library's comprehensive renewal process, which is being driven by the changing values, challenges, needs and technological developments of the 21st century. The process aims to transform the National Library into a leading cultural and educational center serving all of Israel's citizens, the international Jewish community, and diverse audiences worldwide. The process will culminate with the completion of the new National Library campus now under construction in Jerusalem's National District.

Blumberg signed the National Library of Israel Charter at a ceremony attended by Israel's heads of state. He also laid the cornerstone for the new National Library of Israel building adjacent to the Knesset.

Professional career 
From 1971-1981, Blumberg served in various positions at the Bank of Israel, including serving as deputy foreign trade supervisor and deputy director of the Credit Department.

From 1981-1995, Blumberg held several senior positions at United Mizrahi Bank, the fourth largest bank in Israel. From 1988-1993 he served as CEO of Tefahot Israel Mortgage Bank, the largest mortgage bank in Israel at that time. From 1993-1995, he served as CEO of United Mizrahi Bank. From 1995-1998 he served as deputy chairman of the Bank of Jerusalem board of directors and from 1998-2006 as chairman of its board of directors. Blumberg also served as a member of the Bank of Israel's Banking Advisory Committee.

Blumberg also served as a consultant and representative of foreign banks in Israel. From 1997-2000, he served as senior advisor to ANZ Bank for regional activities (Israel, the Palestinian Authority, and Jordan). From 2006-2008 he was the Israeli representative of Eurohypo, the largest real estate bank in Europe.

He previously served as a director of a number of publicly traded companies, including Osem, Bezeq, Africa Israel Investments, Mer Group, U-Bank, and EMI (Mortage Insurance).

From 1999-2002, he served as arbitrator in a dispute between the State of Israel, the Organization of Post-Primary School Teachers and the Teachers' Union; and from 2006-2008 he chaired the arbitration team in a dispute between the State of Israel, Hadassah, the Women's Zionist Organization of America and the Israeli Medical Association.

Since 2008 he has served as chairman of the board of directors of the Israeli Credit Insurance Company (ICIC).

Public Service 
Blumberg is active in philanthropic, cultural, educational, and public affairs. He served on the Board of Governors of the Hebrew University of Jerusalem and of the Open University of Israel, on the Management Committee of the Jerusalem Institute for Policy Research, and as a public representative in the National Labor Court in Israel.

The Adi Foundation 
In 2002 Blumberg established the Adi Foundation in memory of his late daughter Adi Dermer (née Blumberg). The Foundation promotes and nurtures artistic work that examines the relationship between art and Judaism, and endeavors to combine Jewish values with design and artistic expression. The Foundation's central project is a biennial international competition in visual arts and design. The winner of the competition is awarded The Adi Prize for Jewish Expression in Art and Design, as well as a monetary prize. The Adi Foundation also organizes conferences and workshops as well as competition catalogues organized around a central theme.

Awards and recognition 

 In recognition of his work with the National Library and the Adi Foundation, in 2013 Blumberg was chosen to light a torch at Israel's 65th national Independence Day ceremony on Mount Herzl.
 In 2017, he received the prestigious Yakir Yerushalayim (Honorary Citizen of Jerusalem) Prize.

References

External links 
National Library of Israel renewal video, in which David Blumberg speaks (Hebrew)
 Tamar Barzilai, "David Blumberg resigns as chairman of Bank of Jerusalem", Ynet website, July 17, 2005 (Hebrew)
Adi Foundation website
The National Library's renewal website
An interview with David Blumberg in honor of the torch lighting (Hebrew)
 Sigal Klein, "My Jerusalem: Managers in Jerusalem tell personal stories about their Jerusalem", Kol Ha'Ir, May 25, 2017 (Hebrew)

Living people
1944 births
National Library of Israel
Israeli bankers